Gajarajan Pampady Rajan ( 1977)  also written as 'Pampady Rajan.

Pampady Rajan, who was born in Malayattoor Forest Division Kerala was bought in the 1970s by Moodankallungal Baby at an auction from Kodanad elephant training center for Rs 25,000.His early name at kodanad elephant training center was Bastin.Presently living at Pampady a village in kottayam district Kerala. Pampady Rajan has won many Gajapattams (elephant awards) including Gajarajan, Gajakesari, Gajarakthnam, Gajarajaprajapathi, Gajarajakulapathi, Gajaraja Lakshana Perumaal, GajarajaGajothama Thilakam, GajendraKarnan and a rare award called Gajamaanikyam for his beauty. On 21 October 2015, Rajan was honoured with a new title "Saarvabhauman Gajaraja Gandarvan" by Mahanavami committee in Kodunthirapully Village, Palakkad. He is the winner of 2006 and 2007 Ithithanam Elephant Fest which was held at Changanassery in Kottayam district. He has participated in many poorams including the most famous Thrissur pooram. Pambady Rajan is one of the celebrity elephants in Kerala. Since elephants are chosen to carry images of deities at temple festivals based on their stature and bearing, he was one of four elephants featured in life-size advertisements on the highway for a temple in Maradu. Some disputes are there regarding the exact height of Rajan. In 2012, he was measured to be . .

See also
 List of individual elephants

References

External links
 Pambady Rajan at elephant-kerala.com

1977 animal births
Individual elephants
Elephants in Indian culture
Individual animals in India
Elephants in Hinduism
Changanassery
Elephants in Kerala